Fugèreville is a municipality in northwestern Quebec, Canada in the Témiscamingue Regional County Municipality.

Demographics
Population trend:
 Population in 2011: 329 (2006 to 2011 population change: 9.3%)
 Population in 2006: 301
 Population in 2001: 345
 Population in 1996: 376
 Population in 1991: 398

Private dwellings occupied by usual residents: 132 (total dwellings: 210)

Mother tongue:
 English as first language: 3.3%
 French as first language: 96.7%
 English and French as first language: 0%
 Other as first language: 0%

See also
 List of municipalities in Quebec

References

Municipalities in Quebec
Incorporated places in Abitibi-Témiscamingue
Témiscamingue Regional County Municipality